Zsanett Bernadett Kaján (born 16 September 1997) is a Hungarian professional footballer who plays as a forward for Italian club ACF Fiorentina and the Hungarian national team.

Collegiate career
Kaján played forward for the St. John's University Red Storm women's soccer team in Queens, New York City, from 2017 to 2021, scoring 45 goals and 11 assists in nearly 6,000 minutes played and 86 appearances. She was one of eight players to score more than 40 total points in the 2021 NCAA Division I women's soccer season.

Club career

Ferencvárosi TC
While playing with the youth teams of Ferencvárosi TC, Kaján began her club career with the senior team in 2012. She left the team after the 2013–14 JET-SOL Liga Női NB I season, having tied for second-most goals scored on the team's season with 9.

MTK Hungária FC
Kaján played for MTK Hungária FC from 2014 to 2016. In the JET-SOL Liga 2015–16 season, she scored 10 goals in 14 matches, the league's sixth-largest tally. With MTK, she started at forward in 2014–15 UEFA Women's Champions League Round of 32 matches against SV Neulengbach. She scored and assisted in the first leg of the 2016 JET-SOL Liga finals, which MTK lost to Kaján's former team Ferencvárosi TC on aggregate. She then departed for St. John's University in the United States of America.

OL Reign
Kaján was selected eighth overall in the 2022 NWSL Draft by OL Reign of the National Women's Soccer League and signed with the team on 20 January 2022. She did not appear for the Reign in her six months with the team before being transferred for an undisclosed fee to ACF Fiorentina on 27 June 2022.

Fiorentina
On 18 July 2022, ACF Fiorentina announced that the club had signed Kajan to a contract through June 2023.

International career
Kaján earned her first cap with the Hungary women's national football team at the age of 18.

References

External links
 
 
 St. John's bio

1997 births
Living people
Hungarian women's footballers
Hungary women's international footballers
Ferencvárosi TC (women) footballers
MTK Hungária FC (women) players
Expatriate women's footballers in Italy
Hungarian expatriate sportspeople in Italy
Footballers from Budapest
Women's association football forwards
St. John's Red Storm women's soccer players
OL Reign draft picks
OL Reign players
Fiorentina Women's F.C. players
Hungarian expatriate sportspeople in the United States
Hungarian expatriate footballers
Expatriate women's soccer players in the United States